Cadishead Viaduct is a disused railway viaduct of multi-lattice girder construction. It was built in 1892 by the Cheshire Lines Committee to clear the newly built Manchester Ship Canal to carry the new deviation of the Glazebrook to Woodley Main Line.

The route opened to goods on 27 February 1893 and to passenger traffic on 29 May 1893.

Following the withdrawal of passenger services in 1964, the line became goods only, and when expensive repairs to the viaduct were needed in the early 1980s, British Rail closed the viaduct and the preceding line towards Glazebrook.

The viaduct is now blocked with containers on each end owing to anti-social behaviour and to stop people walking across it, as the deck of the viaduct is in a very bad state with major corrosion setting in on the soffits and trough decking of the major steel span of the viaduct.  The Hamilton Davies Trust proposes to restore the viaduct to operation as a multi-modal route, with the potential to operate a heritage railway across it.

See also
 List of lattice girder bridges in the United Kingdom
 Glazebrook East Junction–Skelton Junction line

References

External links
 

Bridges completed in 1893
Railway bridges in Greater Manchester
Former railway bridges in the United Kingdom